This is an incomplete List of ghost towns in Tennessee.

 "Old" Butler
 Cades Cove
 Cute
 Devonia
 Elkmont
 Fork Mountain
 Hopewell
 Loyston
 Morganton
 No Business
 Olympus
 Rhea Springs
 Wasp
 Wheat

Notes and references

 
Tennessee
Ghost towns